Mickey Magnate (Hungarian: Mágnás Miska) is a 1949 Hungarian comedy film directed by Márton Keleti and starring Miklós Gábor, Ági Mészáros and Marika Németh. It was based on a popular stage musical comedy by Károly Bakoni and Andor Gábor which had previously been turned into the 1916 silent film Miska the Magnate directed by Alexander Korda.

Main cast
 Miklós Gábor - Miska 
 Ági Mészáros - Marcsa 
 Marika Németh - Rolla 
 János Sárdy - Baracs Pista, mérnök 
 Kálmán Latabár - Pixi 
 Árpád Latabár - Mixi 
 Mária Sulyok - Korláthyné grófnõ 
 Hilda Gobbi - Nagymama 
 László Kemény - Korláthy gróf 
 Árpád Lehotay - Id. Baracs 
 Sándor Pécsi - Biró 
 Sándor Pethes - Eleméry gróf

References

Bibliography
 Kulik, Karol. Alexander Korda: The Man Who Could Work Miracles. Virgin Books, 1990.

External links

1949 films
Hungarian comedy films
1940s Hungarian-language films
Films directed by Márton Keleti
Hungarian films based on plays
1949 comedy films
Hungarian black-and-white films